Streets of Heaven may refer to:

Streets of Heaven (album) by Sherrié Austin
Streets of Heaven, album by John Illsley 2010
Streets of Heaven (song) by Sherrié Austin